Eduardo Barros (born August 18, 1967) is a Brazilian comic book artist, better known by his pen name of Eddy Barrows. He is best known for his work at DC Comics on such titles as Birds of Prey, Countdown to Adventure, Action Comics, Superman, Teen Titans, and 52.

Early life
Barrows was born on in Belém do Pará, Brazil. He and his parents moved to Belo Horizonte, Minas Gerais when he was 2 years old. During his childhood, his mother introduced him to Turma da Mônica – a Brazilian comic by Maurício de Sousa – and works from the Disney company. She read them to him, and Barrows immediately fell in love with comics immediately, eventually starting to draw. While never having gone to school specifically for art, Barrows studied animation for two to three years before becoming a working artist.

His favorite character is Chico Bento.

Career
When Barrows was 22 years old, Belo Horizonte he began working by doing some pictures for school books, books for kids, and publicity agencies. During this time, Barrows gave up comics for a while. When he was 24, he returned to comics by doing tests for Art & Comics Studios. When he got approval, he began training for six months. Soon after, a career in comics quickly began. His first work was a tie-in comic for the then-World Wrestling Federation on Stone Cold Steve Austin at Chaos Comics. After six issues of that series, Barrows felt he needed "more practice" and took a hiatus from comics in 2001.

He came back to comics in 2003, when landed G.I. Joe for IDW Publishing. Barrows described the experience as "amazing," finally feeling ready and satisfied with his work. Barrows became the official artist of the book until April 2004, when he again decided to leave comics and spend more time on the Jornal Estado de Minas, a local newspaper. In mid-2004, Joe Prado called Barrows asking If he would like to come back to Art & Comics Studios, which he accepted.

After illustrating a comic book for Avatar Press, he submitted three test pages to DC Comics, after which they hired him to work on Bloodhound. Following that, Barrows contributed to Batman: Secret Files Villains 2005 and three issues of Birds of Prey. From there, Barrows became an artist on the weekly series 52 and then teamed with writer Gail Simone on The All-New Atom. After leaving Atom, editor Eddie Berganza offered Countdown To Adventure.

Barrows' took over penciling duties with a year-long run on Teen Titans with writer Sean McKeever, as well as being teamed with writer Greg Rucka for a run on DC's longest running title, Action Comics. As of 2010, Barrows has become one of the main artists for DC's Superman family of titles, collaborating with writer James Robinson on the Man of Steel's tie-in miniseries to the Blackest Night event, illustrating the main story in Free Comic Book Day's War of the Supermen zero-issue, and providing the covers to that main series.

Barrows began his run as artist on DC's Superman, with writer J. Michael Straczynski for the writer's run on the main Superman title, beginning with the "Grounded" story arc with a ten-page entry in issue #700 (August 2010).

Bibliography

DC Comics
52 #8, 12, 18, 22, 44, 49, 52 (2006–2007)
Action Comics (Nightwing & Flamebird) #875–876 (2009)
Atom vol. 2 #4–6, 9–11 (2006–2007)
Batman Villains Secret Files and Origins #1 (2005)
Birds of Prey #85, 87–88 (along with Joe Bennett) (2006)
Blackest Night:
JSA miniseries, #1–3 (among other artists) (2010)
Superman miniseries, #1–3 (2009)
Tales of The Corps 3-issue miniseries, #2 (2009)
Checkmate vol. 2 #14 (along with Joe Bennett) (2007)
Countdown to Adventure (Adam Strange, Animal Man, Starfire), miniseries, #1–3 (2007–2008)
Detective Comics #934–935, 939–940, 944, 946, 950, 965–966, 977, 981, Annual #1 (2016–2018)
Firestorm vol. 3, #21 (along with Jamal Igle), #22 (2006)
Green Lantern vol. 4, #41–42 (along with Philip Tan) (2009)
Justice League of America vol. 4, #34 (along with Ardian Syaf) (2009)
Martian Manhunter vol. 4 #1–6 (2015)
Nightwing vol. 3 #0–3, 5–10, 15–16 (2011–2013)
Suicide Squad vol. 4 #11–15 (backup stories, 2016–2017)
Superman vol. 1 #700–701, 705, 709 (2010–2011)
Superman vol. 3 #23–24 (2013)
Superman 80-Page Giant (Superboy feature, 2011)
Superman: War of the Supermen miniseries, #0 (2010)
Teen Titans vol. 3 #53–54, 56–57, 59–60, 62–63, 65–66, 68 (2008–2009)
Teen Titans vol. 4 #17–22 (2013)

References

External links

 
 
 

1967 births
Living people
People from Belém
Brazilian comics artists